Kuo Cheng-chuan (born 1953) is a Taiwanese politician and business executive.

Kuo graduated from what became Central Police University, and worked for police departments in Taichung County, Taipei County, and Nantou County. Kuo was elected to the Legislative Yuan in 1992 and 1995, as a member of the Kuomintang representing Taichung County. After stepping down from the legislature, Kuo became general manager of Ever Fortune Industrial Company.

References

1953 births
Living people
21st-century Taiwanese businesspeople
Members of the 2nd Legislative Yuan
Members of the 3rd Legislative Yuan
Kuomintang Members of the Legislative Yuan in Taiwan
Taiwanese business executives
Central Police University alumni
Taiwanese police officers
Taichung Members of the Legislative Yuan
Businesspeople from Taichung